Hemba (Emba), also known as Eastern Luba, is a Bantu language of the Democratic Republic of the Congo. It is spoken by the Hemba people. Yazi may be a dialect.

References

 
Luban languages
Languages of the Democratic Republic of the Congo